Ultimate Parkour Challenge is a mini-series that premiered on October 22, 2009 on MTV featuring the six of the top parkour and freerunning competitors from around the world expressing their styles against each other in a series of themed challenges filmed in California. It was originally aired as a special, but a full miniseries aired in May 2010. The series is hosted by freestyle motocross and parkour enthusiast Andy Bell, and stylish freerunner/martial artist Travis Wong. The first season's episodes aired on Thursdays at 10 pm EST on MTV with repeats airing on MTV2. While the second season's time slot moved to 11 pm EST.

Hosts
Andy Bell: A former "Nitro Circus" FMX (freestyle motocross) rider.
Travis Wong: A former nationally ranked "forms and weapons" martial arts competitor.

2009-2010 Competitors

Episodes

Season 1 (2009)

Season Two (2010)

References

External links
 http://www.mtv.com/shows/parkour/series.jhtml
 http://www.americanparkour.com/content/view/6133/1/

MTV original programming
2000s American television miniseries
2010s American television miniseries
2009 American television series debuts
2010 American television series endings
Parkour
Sports entertainment